This article features the naming culture of personal names of ethnic Serbs and the Serbian language. Serbian names are rendered in the "Western name order" with the surname placed after the given name. "Eastern name order" may be used when multiple names appear in a sorted list, particularly in official notes and legal documents when the last name is capitalized (e.g. MILOVANOVIĆ Janko).

Given names 

As in most European cultures, a child is given a first name chosen by their parents or godparents. The given name comes first, the surname last, e.g. Željko Popović, where Željko is a first name and Popović is a family name.

Serbian first names largely originate from Slavic roots: e.g. Miroslav, Vladimir, Zoran, Ljubomir, Vesna, Radmila, Milica, Svetlana, Slavica, Božidarka, Milorad, Dragan, Milan, Goran, Radomir, Vukašin, Miomir, Branimir, Budimir; see also Slavic names, or the list of Slavic names in the Serbian Wikipedia)

Some may be non-Slavic but chosen to reflect Christian faith. Names of this nature may often originate from Hebrew for Biblical reasons. Christian names include: e.g. Nikola, Ivan, Jovan, Marija, Ana, Mihailo. Along similar lines of non-Slavic names among Christians, the origins for many such names are Greek: e.g. Aleksandar, Andrej, Teodora, Jelena, Sofija, Katarina, Nikola, Đorđe, Stefan, Petar, Vasilije, Todor. Names of Latin origin include: e.g. Marko, Anđelka, Antonije, Pavle, Srđan, Marina, Natalija, Kornelije. Names of Germanic origin, entering through Russian, include: e.g. Igor, Oliver, Olga.

In Serbian naming culture, apotropaic names (zaštitna imena, "protective names") include Vuk (and its many derivatives), Nenad, Prodan, Sredoje, Staniša, and others.

Surnames 

Most Serbian surnames have the surname suffix . This can sometimes further be transcribed as -ic, but in history, Serbian names have often been transcribed with a phonetic ending, -ich or -itch.

This form is often associated with Serbs from before the early 20th century: hence Milutin Milanković is usually referred to, for historical reasons, as Milutin Milankovitch, and Mileva Marić, born in Vojvodina (then a part of Hungary) has sometimes been rendered as Marity (e.g. in the claim of "Einstein-Marity" theory).

The  suffix is a Slavic diminutive, originally functioning to create patronymics. Thus the surname Petrović means the little son of Petar (Petrić signifies the little son of Petra, the widow).

Most Serbian surnames are paternal (father), maternal (mother), occupational, or derived from personal traits.

When marrying, the woman most often adopts her husband's family name, though she can also keep both of her last names or not change her last name at all.

The ten most common surnames in Serbia, in order, are Jovanović, Petrović, Nikolić, Marković, Đorđević, Stojanović, Ilić, Stanković, Ivanović, Pavlović and Milošević.

Outside Serbian countries, Slavic suffixes have been transliterated.

Although far less common than patronymic surnames, matronymic surnames are widespread both in Serbia and in neighboring countries where Serbs live. Examples include surnames such as Katić, Sinđelić, Nedić, Marić, Višnjić, Janjić, Sarić, Miličić, Milenić, Natalić, Zorić, Smiljić, Anđelić and many others. Sometimes it is difficult to ascertain if the name of a specific family is patronymic or matronymic considering many Serbian names have both male and female version (for example, surname Miljanić could come from both m.- Miljan and f.- Miljana). Cases where widows had to become heads of households were not uncommon during 18th and 19th century and when surnames were first standardized in Serbia in 1851 it was decided they would be based on the names of eldest living heads of households which in some cases were women. People who did not know their father well would also often take matronymic surnames, with a notable case being the hero of the First Serbian Uprising Stevan Sinđelić, who took that surname in honor of his mother Sinđelija.

History
The names of early Serbian rulers like Mutimir are Slavic dithematic names, as per Old Slavic tradition, until the 9th century and Christianization after which Christian names appear.

Demetrios Chomatenos (Archbishop of Ohrid from 1216 to 1236) registered the naming culture of the South Slavs in Byzantine lands. In the 11th and 12th century, family names became more common and stable in Byzantium, adapted by the majority of people in Byzantine Macedonia, Epirus and other regions (including women, sometimes even monks), not only aristocrats. The South Slavs, however, maintained the tradition of only giving a personal name, sometimes with a Patronymic. There are only 2 cases of family names used by South Slavs during this time; Bogdanopoulos and Serbopoulos, both Serbian names with the Greek suffix -opoulos (όπουλος, originating in Peloponnese in the 10th century). Patronymics ending on -ić, on the other hand, seem to have been the norm by late 14th and early 15th century because nearly all letters of correspondence between Dubrovnik and Serbia and Bosnia from that period contain them. In that same period proper family names of Slavic origin, not just patronymics, appear in Dubrovnik and soon in Hum and then in Serbia and Bosnia where during 15th-century nobles start using proper surnames. However this never became common among ordinary people and since nobility of Serbia and Bosnia was mostly wiped out by 16th century, only their remnants in Venice, Hungary and later Habsburg monarchy as well as some members of high clergy used standard surnames during following centuries. Due to general lack of safety clans started to form in regions of Montenegro and Herzegovina from 15th century onwards. These clans were territorially based but each was subdivided into fraternities so some people used names of these fraternities as a surname in those regions but only when speaking to outsiders and more as a toponymic rather than proper surname.

In older naming convention which was common in Serbia up until the mid 19th century a person's name would consist of three distinct parts: the person's given name, the patronymic derived from father's personal name, and the family or fraternity name, as seen in for example in the name of language reformer Vuk Stefanović Karadžić. However, use of this convention depended on a person's education and interest in his ancestry. Most ordinary people were still referred to mostly by their given name and sometimes with a patronymic, profession or toponymic. Serbian surnames as used today were first standardized in Principality of Serbia during 1851 and on the census of 1854, the population was recorded by their fixed surnames for the first time. Surnames were mostly formed as patronymics (or in some cases matronymics) derived from names of at the time eldest living heads of households rather than distant ancestors, though there were exceptions. In most cases, such patronymics were already in use so they were simply "frozen" and turned into surnames that carried on into future generations. This swift introduction of surnames is one of the reasons why, in comparison to other regions where Serbs live, there is less variation in forms of surnames within central Serbia, where vast majority of surnames ends with suffixes -ović (in patronymic surnames) and -ić (can be used both for patronymic and for matronymic surnames).

Among Serbs that lived across the rivers Drina, Sava and Danube, in addition to surnames with these most common suffixes there were many surnames based on professions, nicknames, toponymics, traits, etc. In case of what was then Southern Hungary, Serb suffixes were often intentionally changed by Austro-Hungarian administrators from -ović, -ević and -ić into -ov, -ev, -in and -ski which in their mind sounded less typically Serbian. This process started around 1817 but was particularly intensified after 1860/61 when Duchy of Serbia and Tamiš Banate was abolished and 1867 when Habsburg monarchy was reformed into Austro-Hungary. By 1900s it had only moderate success and it never achieved its true goal of culturally separating Vojvodina Serbs from their brethren to the south. In some regions with Serbian majority which were only liberated during wars of 1912–1918, standardized surnames were finally introduced with the creation of Kingdom of Serbs, Croats and Slovenes and recorded for the first time during population census of 1921.

Sobriquets

Many Serbs, particularly from the late 18th century onwards and working in many different fields, have been known by three names - their given name, their surname, and an additional sobriquet (distinct from a second surname and specifically used with, as opposed to instead of, their surname or full name).

Some of these are:

 Petar Nikolajević Moler (1775 – 1816), first Prime Minister (1815–16) of the Principality of Serbia and a veteran of both the First and Second Serbian Uprisings whose sobriquet meant "the painter". 
 Jovan Jovanović Zmaj (1833 – 1904), a poet and translator whose sobriquet meant "the dragon". 
 Milan Kujundžić Aberdar (1842 - 1893), a poet, philosopher, and politician whose sobriquet meant "a firearm that hints at good news" (and was also the name of Karađorđe's cannon of the First Serbian Uprising). 
 Stevan Stojanović Mokranjac (1856 – 1914), a composer and music educator whose sobriquet meant "the man from Mokranje", a village in Romania where is ancestors were from. 
 Mihailo Petrović Alas (1868 – 1943), an influential mathematician and inventor and also a professor, businessman, traveller, and volunteer in the Balkan Wars whose sobriquet meant "river fisherman". 
 Vladislav Petković Dis (1880 – 1917), an impressionist poet whose sobriquet was derived from the second syllable of his given name. 
 Vlastimir Pavlović Carevac (1895 – 1965), a violinist and conductor, and founder and director of the National Orchestra of Radio Belgrade. 
 Ljubomir Pavićević Fis (1927 – 2015), a graphic and industrial designer whose sobriquet possibly derived from the pronunciation of the French word fils (equivalent to "junior" in English). 
 Miodrag Petrović Čkalja (1924 - 2003), an actor whose stage name and sobriquet was the name of his character, Čkalja in the 1970 Yugoslav film of the same name. 
 Predrag Koraksić Corax (b. 1933), a political caricaturist whose sobriquet is Latin for "raven".

References

Citations

Sources 
 Books

 
 
 
 
 
 
 
 

 Journals

 
 

 Other

 
 
 

Names by culture
Serbian culture
Slavic-language names